San Francisco Teopan is a town and municipality in Oaxaca in south-western Mexico. The municipality covers an area of 45.93 km². 
It is part of the Coixtlahuaca District in the Mixteca Region.

As of 2005, the municipality had a total population of 390.

References

Municipalities of Oaxaca